Milovan Jakšić (Serbian Cyrillic: Милован Јакшић; 21 September 1909 – 25 December 1953) was a Serbian football goalkeeper.

Career
Remembered mostly as "El Grande Milovan", the nickname he earned for his excellent saves in the game that Yugoslavia won against Brasil in the First World Cup in Uruguay 1930 FIFA World Cup. He is considered one of the major contributors for Yugoslavia reaching the semi-finals in that tournament.

Being of medium stature, but very strong physically, Jakšić's main characteristics were his bravure and excellent reflexes. Jakšić spent most of his career playing in FK BASK, named SK Soko before 1931, where he played until 1939. The only exceptions were the Czechoslovak SK Slavia Praha, where Jakšić played a few months of the 1934-35 season, and SK Ljubljana and ND Ilirija at the end of his career.

Jakšić played a total of seventeen matches for the Yugoslavia national football team. His debut was on 13 April 1930, in a friendly game against Bulgaria in Belgrade, a 6-1 win, and his fairway match was on 2 September 1934, another friendly game, this time in Prague, against Czechoslovakia, a 3-1 loss. Despite all the competition that he faced for the national team goalkeeping place, Jakšić was selected to be the main goalkeeper at the 1930 World Cup. Having displayed magnificent exhibitions in all the matches at the tournament, it is specially remembered by his contributions in the match against Brazil, and it was after that match, that the delighted journalists started calling him by his new nickname: "El Grande Milovan".

After retiring, Jakšić stayed connected to football. After the World War II, in March 1945, he established Red Star Belgrade football club, and was the club's Technical Director. Jakšić was also the President of the Football Coaching Federation of Yugoslavia, from 1950 until the winter of 1953, when he died unexpectedly of a heart-attack during the football tournament in Cairo, Egypt, where he accompanied Red Star Belgrade.

External links
 Profile at Serbian Federation site
 Stats at FIFA.com

1909 births
1953 deaths
People from Kolašin
Serbs of Montenegro
Serbian footballers
Yugoslav footballers
Yugoslavia international footballers
Association football goalkeepers
1930 FIFA World Cup players
FK BASK players
SK Slavia Prague players
ND Ilirija 1911 players
Red Star Belgrade non-playing staff